Vasilyevskaya is a rural locality (a village) in Mityukovskoye Rural Settlement, Vozhegodsky District, Vologda Oblast, Russia. The population was 49 as of 2002.

Geography 
The distance to Vozhega is 71 km, to Sosnovitsa is 3 km. Popovka, Timoshinskaya, Kostyuninskaya are the nearest rural localities.

References 

Rural localities in Vozhegodsky District